Welsby is a surname. It may refer to:

Arthur Welsby (1902–1980), footballer
Chris Welsby (born 1948), filmmaker
Elton Welsby (born 1951), English television sports presenter
John Welsby (1938–2021), Chief Executive of the British Railways Board
Thomas Welsby (1858–1941), Queensland businessman, author, politician, and sportsman.
William Newland Welsby (d. 1864), legal writer

It might also refer to Welsby, Queensland, a locality on Bribie Island named after Thomas Welsby.